Flisom is a developer and manufacturer of photovoltaic (PV) thin film solar cells, located near Zurich, Switzerland. The company produces high-efficiency CIGS thin film solar modules on flexible plastic foil using proprietary roll-to-roll manufacturing techniques.

The innovative manufacturing technology enables price competition with established c-si PV manufacturing systems at a comparatively smaller production scale. Furthermore, the lightweight, flexible, jet-black and thin solar panels potentially can bring down the overall costs for fully installed solar PV systems. This is about half the cost of conventional PV technology based on crystalline silicon.

Potential applications for flexible lightweight CIGS modules include building integrated photovoltaics (BIPV), applied photovoltaics (BAPV), as well as customized solar panels for Transportation & Mobility and portable rollable power systems.

History 

Flisom AG was founded in 2005 as a spin-off company of ETH Zurich, and has a long-standing research partnership with Empa – the Swiss Federal Laboratories for Material Science and Technology, which has been developing this type of flexible solar cell to world record efficiencies of 20.4%. The world record for CIGS cells based in laboratory conditions has since been further increased by ZSW and stands at 21.7% as of July 2015. Since this record was achieved on glass substrate, Flisom's research partner Empa is still the holder of the world record with 20.4% cell efficiency on a polymeric substrate.

Technology 

The company's production technology is based on a roll-to-roll manufacturing process of flexible solar modules, involving deposition of thin films of CIGS absorber material onto a polymer foil substrate made of polyimide. The key processes of depositing the absorber material in this manner has been proprietarily developed by the company itself. As of 2015, a 15 MW pilot production line is being commissioned in a new facility in Niederhasli, near Zurich, Switzerland.

See also 
 List of CIGS companies
 Solar Frontier
 Thin film solar cell
 Swiss Federal Laboratories for Materials Science and Technology

References

External links 
 Flisom: Flexible PV from Lab to Fab 
 Empa Laboratory for Thin Films and Photovoltaics 

Thin-film cell manufacturers
Sustainable energy
Swiss brands